Cyrioides is a genus of beetles in the family Buprestidae, containing the following species:

 Cyrioides australis (Boisduval, 1835) - dark blue banksia jewel beetle  (Eastern Australia)
 Cyrioides cincta (Carter, 1908) (Queensland)
 Cyrioides elateroides (Saunders, 1872) (southwest Western Australia)
 Cyrioides imperialis (Fabricius, 1801) - banksia jewel beetle (Eastern Australia and Tasmania)
 Cyrioides sexspilota (Carter, 1920) (Queensland)
 Cyrioides vittigera (Laporte & Gory, 1835) -  striped banksia jewel beetle  (Western Australia)

References

Buprestidae genera